Vokkaligara Sangha is a community organisation that was founded in 1986 in Bangalore (now Bengaluru in Karnataka, India) to promote the social, cultural and educational aspirations of the Vokkaliga community. Its headquarters are in Bengaluru and there are many affiliated regional sanghas.

Management
Elected members handle key roles in the Sangha's activities, including institutions that it owns. They serve as community representatives of their regions.

Institutions
The Sangha runs educational institutions such as Bangalore Institute of Technology.

References
 Dr. B.S. Puttaswamy. VOKKALIGARA SANGHA (1906-2006) Manoj Publication, 2015, Bengaluru, . 

Karnataka society
Vokkaliga